The Bridge of San Luis Rey is a 2004 French-Spanish-British drama film directed by Mary McGuckian and featuring an ensemble cast, including Robert De Niro, Pilar López de Ayala, F. Murray Abraham, Kathy Bates, Gabriel Byrne, Émilie Dequenne, and Harvey Keitel. It is based on Thornton Wilder's novel of the same name. The film was released in 2004 in Spain and 2005 in the U.S. and abroad. Despite praise for its costume design, the film was poorly received by critics.

Synopsis
The film centers on a basic premise: near Lima, Peru, at noon of Friday, 20 July 1714, a bridge woven by the Incas a century earlier collapsed at that particular moment, while five people were crossing it: Doña María, the Marquess of Montemayor; Pepita, her lady in attendance; Esteban, a scribe; Uncle Pío; and a young child. The collapse was witnessed by Brother Juniper, a Franciscan friar, who was on his way to cross it. Curious about why God would allow such a tragedy, he decides to take a scientific approach to the question. He set out to interview everyone he can find who knew the five victims. Over the course of six years, he has managed to compile a huge book, coming to the question whether we live our lives according to a plan or if there is no such thing as a bigger scheme.

Cast 
 F. Murray Abraham as the Viceroy of Peru
 Kathy Bates as the Marquesa
 Gabriel Byrne as Brother Juniper
 Geraldine Chaplin as the Abbess
 Robert De Niro as the Diego de Parada, the Archbishop of Lima
 Émilie Dequenne as Doña Clara
 Adriana Domínguez as Pepita
 Harvey Keitel as Uncle Pio
 Pilar López de Ayala as Micaela Villegas (La Perichole)
 John Lynch as Captain de Alvarado
 Mark Polish as Manuel
 Michael Polish as Esteban
 Jim Sheridan as The King of Spain
 Dominique Pinon as His Excellency's Fop

Background and production
The film and novel are very loosely based on the life of Micaela Villegas (1748–1819), a famous Peruvian entertainer known as La Perricholi, whose life was also the inspiration for the novella Le Carrosse du Saint-Sacrement by Prosper Mérimée, an opéra bouffe, La Périchole  by Jacques Offenbach, Jean Renoir’s 1953 film Le Carrosse d'or (The Golden Coach), and two earlier film versions: a 1929 silent version, The Bridge of San Luis Rey (1929) starring Lili Damita, and a 1944 version, The Bridge of San Luis Rey starring Lynn Bari, Francis Lederer, Akim Tamiroff, and Alla Nazimova.

Reception
On Rotten Tomatoes, the film has an approval rating of 4% based on reviews from 24 critics. The site's consensus states: "Despite an all-star cast and some impressive visuals, The Bridge of San Luis Rey is a lifeless, slow-going adaptation of Thornton Wilder's classic novel."

Stephen Garrett of Time Out wrote, "Why do good actors pop up in bad movies? More perplexingly, why do so many good actors end up in the same bad movie?", and Desson Thomas of The Washington Post wrote, "Even though director-adaptor Mary McGuckian expended much creative energy trying to pump original spirit into the characters, she never brings any of them to life."

On June 2, it was announced that the film had been recut, remastered, and rescored in order to restore it to the version based on the original script including 40 minutes of previously unseen footage. The Bridge of San Luis Rey Remastered is to be released on digital by Giant Pictures across North America on June 14.

References

External links
 
 
 

2004 films
British historical drama films
French historical drama films
Spanish historical drama films
Spanish independent films
2000s historical drama films
English-language French films
English-language Spanish films
Films based on American novels
Films set in Peru
Films set in the 1710s
French independent films
British independent films
Films scored by Lalo Schifrin
Films about bridges
2004 independent films
2004 drama films
2000s English-language films
2000s British films
2000s French films